The 2001–02 NBA season was the Spurs' 26th season in the National Basketball Association, the 29th in San Antonio, and 35th season as a franchise. During the off-season, the Spurs acquired Steve Smith from the Portland Trail Blazers, and signed free agents Bruce Bowen, second-year guard Stephen Jackson, and Charles Smith, and drafted French basketball star Tony Parker with the 28th overall pick in the 2001 NBA draft. This was also the Spurs' last season at the Alamodome, as they moved into the brand new SBC Center the next season. The Spurs won 20 of their first 24 games after a ten-game winning streak in December, held a 31–17 record at the All-Star break, then posted a 13-game winning streak in March and won their final nine games, finishing first place in the Midwest Division with a 58–24 record.

Tim Duncan averaged 25.5 points, 12.7 rebounds and 2.5 blocks per game as he earned his first NBA MVP award, joining David Robinson as the only Spurs to win the award. He was also named to the All-NBA First Team, NBA All-Defensive First Team, and was selected for the 2002 NBA All-Star Game. In addition, Robinson averaged 12.2 points, 8.3 rebounds and 1.8 blocks per game, while Smith contributed 11.6 points per game, and Parker provided the team with 9.2 points and 4.3 assists per game, and made the NBA All-Rookie First Team. Malik Rose averaged 9.4 points and 6.0 rebounds per game off the bench, while Antonio Daniels provided with 9.2 points per game also off the bench, and Bowen contributed 7.0 points per game. Rose finished in fourth place in Sixth Man of the Year voting, and Bowen was selected to the NBA All-Defensive Second Team.

In the 2002 NBA Playoffs, the Spurs breezed past the Seattle SuperSonics in five games in the Western Conference First Round, but they were eliminated in the Western Conference Semi-finals by the eventual champion Los Angeles Lakers in five games. The Lakers would then go on to defeat the New Jersey Nets in four straight games in the NBA Finals, winning their third consecutive championship. For the second year in a row, the Spurs had their playoff run ended by the Lakers.

Following the season, Daniels and Smith were both traded to the Portland Trail Blazers, and Terry Porter retired after seventeen seasons in the NBA.

Draft picks

Roster

Regular season

Season standings

z - clinched division title
y - clinched division title
x - clinched playoff spot

Record vs. opponents

Game log

Regular season 

|- bgcolor="#ccffcc"
| 1
| October 30
| L. A. Clippers
| 
| Steve Smith (19)
| Tim Duncan (13)
| Terry Porter (6)
| Alamodome16,803
| 1–0

|- bgcolor="#ffcccc"
| 2
| November 1
| @ Seattle
| 
| Tim Duncan (22)
| Tim Duncan (13)
| Tim Duncan, Steve Smith (4)
| KeyArena15,491
| 1–1
|- bgcolor="#ccffcc"
| 3
| November 3
| @ Portland
| 
| Steve Smith (36)
| Tim Duncan (15)
| Tony Parker (6)
| Rose Garden Arena19,980
| 2–1
|- bgcolor="#ffcccc"
| 4
| November 4
| @ Sacramento
| 
| Tim Duncan (17)
| Tim Duncan (13)
| Antonio Daniels, Terry Porter (3)
| ARCO Arena17,317
| 2–2
|- bgcolor="#ccffcc"
| 5
| November 6
| Orlando
| 
| Tim Duncan (26)
| Tim Duncan (14)
| Terry Porter (5)
| Alamodome15,927
| 3–2
|- bgcolor="#ccffcc"
| 6
| November 8
| @ Charlotte
| 
| Tim Duncan (33)
| Tim Duncan (16)
| Terry Porter, Tony Parker, Bruce Bowen (5)
| Charlotte Coliseum9,511
| 4–2
|- bgcolor="#ccffcc"
| 7
| November 10
| Atlanta
| 
| Tim Duncan (20)
| Tim Duncan (13)
| Tony Parker (8)
| Alamodome20,403
| 5–2
|- bgcolor="#ccffcc"
| 8
| November 13
| Houston
| 
| Tim Duncan (19)
| Tim Duncan (9)
| Tony Parker (4)
| Alamodome15,643
| 6–2
|- bgcolor="#ccffcc"
| 9
| November 16
| Cleveland
| 
| Tim Duncan (27)
| Malik Rose (11)
| Tony Parker (8)
| Alamodome19,222
| 7–2
|- bgcolor="#ccffcc"
| 10
| November 21
| Seattle
| 
| Tim Duncan (30)
| Tim Duncan (13)
| Tony Parker (7)
| Alamodome18,163
| 8–2
|- bgcolor="#ccffcc"
| 11
| November 23
| @ Indiana
| 
| Tim Duncan (30)
| Tim Duncan (18)
| Tim Duncan (5)
| Conseco Fieldhouse18,345
| 9–2
|- bgcolor="#ffcccc"
| 12
| November 24
| @ Minnesota
| 
| Tim Duncan (21)
| Tim Duncan (18)
| Tim Duncan (8)
| Target Center19,006
| 9–3
|- bgcolor="#ccffcc"
| 13
| November 28
| Golden State
| 
| David Robinson (19)
| David Robinson, Tim Duncan (12)
| Tim Duncan (5)
| Alamodome16,442
| 10–3
|- bgcolor="#ffcccc"
| 14
| November 30
| Sacramento
| 
| Tim Duncan (38)
| David Robinson (12)
| Tony Parker (4)
| Alamodome26,808
| 10–4

|- bgcolor="#ccffcc"
| 15
| December 1
| @ Houston
| 
| Tim Duncan (25)
| Tim Duncan (12)
| Tony Parker (5)
| Compaq Center12,232
| 11–4
|- bgcolor="#ccffcc"
| 16
| December 4
| Washington
| 
| Antonio Daniels (15)
| Tim Duncan (11)
| Tim Duncan, Tony Parker (5)
| Alamodome35,052
| 12–4
|- bgcolor="#ccffcc"
| 17
| December 5
| @ Atlanta
| 
| Steve Smith (29)
| Tim Duncan (15)
| Tony Parker (8)
| Philips Arena8,253
| 13–4
|- bgcolor="#ccffcc"
| 18
| December 7
| Philadelphia
| 
| Charles Smith (20)
| Tim Duncan, David Robinson, Malik Rose (9)
| Antonio Daniels (6)
| Alamodome29,836
| 14–4
|- bgcolor="#ccffcc"
| 19
| December 12
| Toronto
| 
| Tim Duncan (28)
| Tim Duncan (13)
| Tony Parker (6)
| Alamodome16,650
| 15–4
|- bgcolor="#ccffcc"
| 20
| December 14
| @ Phoenix
| 
| Tim Duncan (32)
| Tim Duncan (19)
| Terry Porter (6)
| America West Arena16,187
| 16–4
|- bgcolor="#ccffcc"
| 21
| December 15
| Utah
| 
| Tim Duncan (26)
| Tim Duncan (10)
| Terry Porter (3)
| Alamodome20,712
| 17–4
|- bgcolor="#ccffcc"
| 22
| December 18
| @ Denver
| 
| Tim Duncan (24)
| Tim Duncan (16)
| Tim Duncan (5)
| Pepsi Center14,118
| 18–4
|- bgcolor="#ccffcc"
| 23
| December 19
| Portland
| 
| Tim Duncan (26)
| David Robinson (16)
| Tony Parker (6)
| Alamodome16,089
| 19–4
|- bgcolor="#ccffcc"
| 24
| December 21
| Denver
| 
| Tim Duncan (21)
| David Robinson, Malik Rose (8)
| Charles Smith (5)
| Alamodome22,831
| 20–4
|- bgcolor="#ffcccc"
| 25
| December 23
| Milwaukee
| 
| Tim Duncan (22)
| Tim Duncan (18)
| Tony Parker (5)
| Alamodome24,708
| 20–5
|- bgcolor="#ffcccc"
| 26
| December 26
| Dallas
| 
| Tim Duncan (53)
| Tim Duncan (11)
| Tim Duncan (4)
| Alamodome20,667
| 20–6
|- bgcolor="#ffcccc"
| 27
| December 29
| @ Milwaukee
| 
| Tim Duncan (38)
| Tim Duncan (16)
| Tony Parker (7)
| Bradley Center18,717
| 20–7
|- bgcolor="#ccffcc"
| 28
| December 30
| @ Memphis
| 
| Tim Duncan (27)
| Tim Duncan (18)
| Steve Smith, Antonio Daniels (5)
| Pyramid Arena17,358
| 21–7

|- bgcolor="#ccffcc"
| 29
| January 2
| Detroit
| 
| Tim Duncan (20)
| Tim Duncan (15)
| Terry Porter (8)
| Alamodome16,648
| 22–7
|- bgcolor="#ffcccc"
| 30
| January 4
| Indiana
| 
| Tim Duncan (22)
| Tim Duncan (12)
| Tim Duncan (6)
| Alamodome29,243
| 22–8
|- bgcolor="#ccffcc"
| 31
| January 5
| @ Dallas
| 
| Tim Duncan (29)
| Tim Duncan (17)
| Terry Porter (6)
| American Airlines Center20,123
| 23–8
|- bgcolor="#ccffcc"
| 32
| January 7
| New York
| 
| Tim Duncan (21)
| Tim Duncan (12)
| Tony Parker (5)
| Alamodome18,428
| 24–8
|- bgcolor="#ccffcc"
| 33
| January 9
| @ Boston
| 
| Tim Duncan (25)
| Tim Duncan (12)
| Antonio Daniels (5)
| FleetCenter16,003
| 25–8
|- bgcolor="#ffcccc"
| 34
| January 11
| @ Philadelphia
| 
| Tim Duncan (22)
| Tim Duncan (15)
| Tony Parker, Antonio Daniels, Terry Porter (3)
| First Union Center20,488
| 25–9
|- bgcolor="#ffcccc"
| 35
| January 14
| @ New Jersey
| 
| Tim Duncan (27)
| Tim Duncan (9)
| Tim Duncan, Terry Porter (6)
| Continental Airlines Arena11,091
| 25–10
|- bgcolor="#ccffcc"
| 36
| January 15
| @ Washington
| 
| Tim Duncan (22)
| David Robinson (10)
| Terry Porter (7)
| MCI Center20,674
| 26–10
|- bgcolor="#ccffcc"
| 37
| January 17
| Utah
| 
| Tim Duncan (35)
| Tim Duncan (10)
| Antonio Daniels (6)
| Alamodome16,868
| 27–10
|- bgcolor="#ffcccc"
| 38
| January 19
| L. A. Lakers
| 
| Charles Smith (21)
| Tim Duncan (15)
| Tim Duncan (4)
| Alamodome33,544
| 27–11
|- bgcolor="#ffcccc"
| 39
| January 22
| New Jersey
| 
| Tim Duncan (32)
| Tim Duncan (14)
| Charles Smith (6)
| Alamodome17,701
| 27–12
|- bgcolor="#ccffcc"
| 40
| January 23
| @ Utah
| 
| Steve Smith (29)
| Tim Duncan (9)
| Antonio Daniels (5)
| Delta Center19,623
| 28–12
|- bgcolor="#ffcccc"
| 41
| January 25
| @ L. A. Lakers
| 
| Tim Duncan (24)
| David Robinson (12)
| Terry Porter (6)
| STAPLES Center18,997
| 28–13
|- bgcolor="#ccffcc"
| 42
| January 26
| @ Golden State
| 
| Tim Duncan (20)
| Tim Duncan (9)
| Tony Parker (6)
| The Arena in Oakland18,328
| 29–13
|- bgcolor="#ffcccc"
| 43
| January 29
| Charlotte
| 
| Tim Duncan (29)
| Tim Duncan (21)
| Tony Parker (4)
| Alamodome16,624
| 29–14
|- bgcolor="#ffcccc"
| 44
| January 31
| L. A. Clippers
| 
| Tim Duncan (23)
| Tim Duncan (16)
| Antonio Daniels (4)
| Alamodome17,288
| 29–15

|- bgcolor="#ffcccc"
| 45
| February 1
| @ Miami
| 
| Tim Duncan (29)
| Tim Duncan (12)
| Tony Parker (5)
| AmericanAirlines Arena15,658
| 29–16
|- bgcolor="#ccffcc"
| 46
| February 3
| @ Orlando
| 
| Tim Duncan (29)
| Tim Duncan (15)
| Antonio Daniels (7)
| TD Waterhouse Centre15,072
| 30–16
|- bgcolor="#ccffcc"
| 47
| February 4
| Minnesota
| 
| David Robinson, Tim Duncan, Antonio Daniels (13)
| David Robinson (15)
| Tony Parker (5)
| Alamodome17,809
| 31–16
|- bgcolor="#ffcccc"
| 48
| February 7
| @ Toronto
| 
| Tim Duncan (22)
| Tim Duncan (17)
| Steve Smith (5)
| Air Canada Centre19,800
| 31–17
|- align="center"
|colspan="9" bgcolor="#bbcaff"|All-Star Break
|- bgcolor="#ffcccc"
| 49
| February 12
| @ Sacramento
| 
| Tim Duncan (24)
| Tim Duncan (21)
| Tony Parker (6)
| ARCO Arena17,317
| 31–18
|- bgcolor="#ccffcc"
| 50
| February 14
| @ L. A. Clippers
| 
| Tim Duncan (15)
| Tim Duncan (11)
| Antonio Daniels, Steve Smith (4)
| STAPLES Center18,964
| 32–18
|- bgcolor="#ccffcc"
| 51
| February 15
| @ Golden State
| 
| Tim Duncan (36)
| Tim Duncan (11)
| Tim Duncan (8)
| The Arena in Oakland14,187
| 33–18
|- bgcolor="#ccffcc"
| 52
| February 19
| Memphis
| 
| Tim Duncan (23)
| David Robinson (14)
| Tim Duncan, Antonio Daniels, Tony Parker (5)
| Alamodome16,229
| 34–18
|- bgcolor="#ccffcc"
| 53
| February 21
| Sacramento
| 
| Charles Smith (32)
| Tim Duncan (13)
| Tony Parker (7)
| Alamodome18,594
| 35–18
|- bgcolor="#ffcccc"
| 54
| February 23
| Minnesota
| 
| Tim Duncan (25)
| David Robinson (9)
| Antonio Daniels (6)
| Alamodome34,735
| 35–19
|- bgcolor="#ffcccc"
| 55
| February 24
| @ Phoenix
| 
| David Robinson (25)
| Tim Duncan (13)
| Tim Duncan (5)
| America West Arena15,836
| 35–20
|- bgcolor="#ccffcc"
| 56
| February 26
| Phoenix
| 
| Tim Duncan (29)
| Tim Duncan (15)
| David Robinson (5)
| Alamodome19,013
| 36–20
|- bgcolor="#ffcccc"
| 57
| February 28
| @ Cleveland
| 
| Tim Duncan (35)
| Tim Duncan (12)
| Charles Smith (7)
| Gund Arena15,481
| 36–21

|- bgcolor="#ccffcc"
| 58
| March 1 
| @ Minnesota
| 
| Tim Duncan (25)
| Tim Duncan (11)
| Tony Parker (6)
| Target Center19,799
| 37–21
|- bgcolor="#ccffcc"
| 59
| March 3
| @ New York
| 
| Tim Duncan (25)
| David Robinson (15)
| Tony Parker (7)
| Madison Square Garden19,763
| 38–21
|- bgcolor="#ccffcc"
| 60
| March 5
| Golden State
| 
| Tim Duncan (23)
| David Robinson (9)
| Tony Parker (7)
| Alamodome19,322
| 39–21
|- bgcolor="#ccffcc"
| 61
| March 7
| Houston
| 
| Tim Duncan (30)
| Tim Duncan (16)
| Tim Duncan, Tony Parker (5)
| Alamodome17,094
| 40–21
|- bgcolor="#ccffcc"
| 62
| March 9
| @ Chicago
| 
| Tim Duncan (22)
| Tim Duncan, David Robinson (11)
| Tim Duncan (7)
| United Center20,489
| 41–21
|- bgcolor="#ccffcc"
| 63
| March 11
| @ Denver
| 
| Tim Duncan (21)
| Tim Duncan (9)
| Terry Porter (6)
| Pepsi Center13,511
| 42–21
|- bgcolor="#ccffcc"
| 64
| March 12
| Memphis
| 
| Tim Duncan (23)
| Tim Duncan (13)
| Tony Parker (5)
| Alamodome19,519
| 43–21
|- bgcolor="#ccffcc"
| 65
| March 14
| Chicago
| 
| Tim Duncan (24)
| David Robinson (17)
| Tim Duncan, Antonio Daniels, Tony Parker (4)
| Alamodome19,592
| 44–21
|- bgcolor="#ccffcc"
| 66
| March 16
| Boston
| 
| Tim Duncan (37)
| Tim Duncan (10)
| Danny Ferry, Tony Parker (5)
| Alamodome34,753
| 45–21
|- bgcolor="#ccffcc"
| 67
| March 20
| L. A. Lakers
| 
| Tim Duncan (25)
| Tim Duncan (9)
| Antonio Daniels, Terry Porter (6)
| Alamodome30,775
| 46–21
|- bgcolor="#ccffcc"
| 68
| March 21
| @ Dallas
| 
| Tim Duncan (32)
| Tim Duncan (14)
| Tim Duncan (5)
| American Airlines Center20,133
| 47–21
|- bgcolor="#ccffcc"
| 69
| March 23
| Miami
| 
| Tim Duncan (23)
| Tim Duncan (11)
| Tony Parker (8)
| American Airlines Center24,336
| 48–21
|- bgcolor="#ccffcc"
| 70
| March 25
| @ L. A. Clippers
| 
| Tim Duncan (33)
| Tim Duncan (13)
| Tony Parker (7)
| STAPLES Center20,128
| 49–21
|- bgcolor="#ffcccc"
| 71
| March 27
| @ Portland
| 
| Tim Duncan (34)
| Tim Duncan, David Robinson (11)
| Tony Parker (8)
| Rose Garden Arena19,980
| 49–22
|- bgcolor="#ffcccc"
| 72
| March 29
| @ Seattle
| 
| Tim Duncan (25)
| Tim Duncan (16)
| Steve Smith (5)
| KeyArena17,072
| 49–23
|- bgcolor="#ffcccc"
| 73
| March 31
| @ L. A. Lakers
| 
| Tim Duncan (26)
| Tim Duncan (11)
| Tim Duncan (8)
| STAPLES Center17,072
| 49–24

|- bgcolor="#ccffcc"
| 74
| April 3
| Seattle
| 
| Tim Duncan (30)
| Tim Duncan (18)
| Tim Duncan (9)
| Alamodome19,223
| 50–24
|- bgcolor="#ccffcc"
| 75
| April 4
| Houston
| 
| Tim Duncan (22)
| Malik Rose (14)
| Tony Parker (7)
| Compaq Center12,169
| 51–24
|- bgcolor="#ccffcc"
| 76
| April 6
| Dallas
| 
| Tim Duncan (33)
| Tim Duncan (16)
| Tim Duncan, Tony Parker (5)
| Alamodome34,739
| 52–24
|- bgcolor="#ccffcc"
| 77
| April 8
| Portland
| 
| Tim Duncan (24)
| Tim Duncan (8)
| Tim Duncan (6)
| Alamodome28,278
| 53–24
|- bgcolor="#ccffcc"
| 78
| April 10
| Denver
| 
| Tim Duncan (16)
| Tim Duncan (11)
| Bruce Bowen (4)
| Alamodome19,893
| 54–24
|- bgcolor="#ccffcc"
| 79
| April 12
| @ Detroit
| 
| Tim Duncan (32)
| Tim Duncan (11)
| Tony Parker (10)
| The Palace of Auburn Hills22,076
| 55–24
|- bgcolor="#ccffcc"
| 80
| April 13
| @ Memphis
| 
| Tim Duncan (30)
| Tim Duncan (14)
| Tim Duncan, Antonio Daniels (7)
| Pyramid Arena19,405
| 56–24
|- bgcolor="#ccffcc"
| 81
| April 16
| Phoenix
| 
| Tim Duncan (24)
| Tim Duncan (11)
| Tony Parker (7)
| Alamodome30,186
| 57–24
|- bgcolor="#ccffcc"
| 82
| April 17
| @ Utah
| 
| Tim Duncan (26)
| Tim Duncan (16)
| Tim Duncan (6)
| Delta Center19,490
| 58–24

Playoffs

|- align="center" bgcolor="#ccffcc"
| 1
| April 20
| Seattle
| W 110–89
| Duncan, Parker (21)
| Tim Duncan (10)
| Tim Duncan (11)
| Alamodome23,634
| 1–0
|- align="center" bgcolor="#ffcccc"
| 2
| April 22
| Seattle
| L 90–98
| Tim Duncan (32)
| Tim Duncan (12)
| Tim Duncan (3)
| Alamodome23,059
| 1–1
|- align="center" bgcolor="#ccffcc"
| 3
| April 27
| @ Seattle
| W 102–75
| Tim Duncan (27)
| Tim Duncan (13)
| Tim Duncan (5)
| KeyArena17,072
| 2–1
|- align="center" bgcolor="#ffcccc"
| 4
| May 1
| @ Seattle
| L 79–91
| Malik Rose (28)
| Malik Rose (13)
| Porter, Rose (3)
| KeyArena17,072
| 2–2
|- align="center" bgcolor="#ccffcc"
| 5
| May 3
| Seattle
| W 101–78
| Tim Duncan (23)
| Malik Rose (13)
| Steve Smith (6)
| Alamodome23,369
| 3–2
|-

|- align="center" bgcolor="#ffcccc"
| 1
| May 5
| @ L.A. Lakers
| L 80–86
| Tim Duncan (26)
| Tim Duncan (21)
| Tim Duncan (5)
| Staples Center18,997
| 0–1
|- align="center" bgcolor="#ccffcc"
| 2
| May 7
| @ L.A. Lakers
| W 88–85
| Tim Duncan (27)
| Tim Duncan (17)
| Tony Parker (9)
| Staples Center18,997
| 1–1
|- align="center" bgcolor="#ffcccc"
| 3
| May 10
| L.A. Lakers
| L 89–99
| Tim Duncan (28)
| Tim Duncan (12)
| Tony Parker (5)
| Alamodome35,520
| 1–2
|- align="center" bgcolor="#ffcccc"
| 4
| May 12
| L.A. Lakers
| L 85–87
| Tim Duncan (30)
| Duncan, Robinson (11)
| Tim Duncan (6)
| Alamodome32,342
| 1–3
|- align="center" bgcolor="#ffcccc"
| 5
| May 14
| @ L.A. Lakers
| L 87–93
| Tim Duncan (34)
| Tim Duncan (25)
| Tony Parker (6)
| Staples Center18,997
| 1–4
|-

Player statistics

Regular season

Playoffs

Awards and records
Tim Duncan, NBA Most Valuable Player Award
Tim Duncan, All-NBA First Team
Tim Duncan, NBA All-Defensive First Team
Bruce Bowen, NBA All-Defensive Second Team
Tony Parker, NBA All-Rookie Team 1st Team

Transactions

Overview 

Player Transactions Citation:

References

See also
2001–02 NBA season

San Antonio Spurs seasons
San Antonio
San Antonio
San Antonio